This is a list of South African sportspeople, organized by the sport which they are primarily known for.

American football 

 Gary Anderson, kicker for Pittsburgh, Philadelphia, San Francisco, Minnesota and Tennessee (born 1959)
 Ezra Butler, linebacker for the New York Jets (born 1984)
Greg Joseph (born 1994), placekicker for the Tennessee Titans of the National Football League
 Jerome Pathon, wide receiver for Indianapolis, New Orleans and Atlanta (born 1975)
 Naas Botha, placekicker for Dallas Cowboys (born 1958)

Athletics 

 Ewald Bonzet (1951–2016), track and road runner
 Okkert Brits (born 1973), pole-vaulter
 Zola Budd (born 1966), marathon and long-distance runner
 Hestrie Cloete (born 1978), high jumper
 Bruce Fordyce (born 1955), ultra-marathon runner
 Jacques Freitag (born 1982), high jumper
 Llewellyn Herbert (born 1977), 400 m hurdles, Olympic bronze medallist
 Frantz Kruger (born 1975), discus thrower
 Mbulaeni Mulaudzi (1980–2014), middle-distance runner, Olympic silver medallist
 Carle Pace (1918–2008), marathon runner, 400 m and 800 m record holder, cyclist
 Oscar Pistorius (born 1986), disabled runner
 Philip Rabinowitz (1904–2008), sprinter
 Hezekiél Sepeng (born 1974), middle-distance runner, Olympic silver medallist
 Josia Thugwane (born 1971), marathon runner, Olympic gold medallist
 Louis Jacob van Zyl (born 1985), 400 m hurdles, Commonwealth Games gold medallist

Baseball 

 Barry Armitage, pitcher (born 1979)
 Gavin Fingleson, second baseman (born 1979), silver medalist for Australia in 2004 Athens Olympics
 Gift Ngoepe, infielder (born 1990)

Basketball 

 Steve Nash, point guard for the Los Angeles Lakers (born 1974)
 Thabo Sefolosha, shooting guard for Chicago and Oklahoma City (born 1984)

Boxing 

 Cassius Baloyi, featherweight boxer (born 1974)
 Mike Bernardo, boxer, kickboxer, mixed martial arts fighter (born 1969)
 Francois Botha, heavyweight boxer (born 1968)
 Vuyani Bungu, IBF Super Bantamweight Champion 1994–1999 (born 1967)
 Gerrie Coetzee, World Boxing Association heavyweight champion (born 1955)
 Pierre Coetzer, heavyweight boxer, (born 1961)
 Nick Durandt, boxing trainer and manager  (1963–2017)
 Pierre Fourie, middle and light heavyweight boxer (1943–1980)
 Thomas Hamilton-Brown, 1936 Summer Olympics lightweight (born 1916)
 Kallie Knoetze, heavyweight boxer (born 1953)
 Lehlohonolo Ledwaba, IBF Super Bantamweight Champion 1999–2001 (born 1971)
 Elijah 'Tap Tap' Makhatini, middleweight boxer (born 1942)
 Masibulele Makepula, professional boxer (born 1973)
 "Baby" Jakes Matlala, junior flyweight champion (born 1962–2013)
 Brian Mitchell, WBA Super Featherweight Champion 1986–1991, IBF Super Featherweight Champion 1991
 Welcome Ncita, IBF Super Bantamweight Champion 1990–1992 (born 1965)
 Corrie Sanders, heavyweight boxer (1966–2012)
 Mike Schutte, heavyweight boxer (1950–2008)
 Mzukisi Sikali, flyweight boxer (1971–2005)
 Dingaan Thobela, Super Middleweight (born 1966)

Canoeing

 Bridgitte Hartley, 2012 Bronze Medal winner at the Olympics
 Graeme Pope-Ellis, 15 time Dusi canoe marathon winner
 Shaun Rubenstein (born 1983), canoer and World Marathon champion 2006

Cricket 
See also: South African Test cricketers, South African ODI cricketers, South African Twenty20 International cricketers, South African women Test cricketers

 Shafiek Abrahams (born 1968), right-arm spin bowler
 Warwick Abrahim (born 1990), first-class, List A, and T20 cricketer
 Clifford Abrams (1935–2002), first-class cricketer
 Paul Adams (born 1977), left-arm spin bowler
 Adam Bacher (born 1973), right-handed batsman
 Ali Bacher (born 1942), right-handed batsman and administrator
 Edgar John Barlow (1940–2005), right-arm fast bowler and coach
 Derrin Bassage (born 1978), left-handed batsman
 Christian Begg (born 1986), left-handed batsman
 Nicky Boje (born 1973), all-rounder
 Tertius Bosch (1966–2000), right-arm fast bowler
 Johan Botha (born 1982), right-arm spin bowler
 Mark Boucher (born 1976), wicket-keeper and right-handed batsman
 Charles Brockway (1907–1985), slow left-arm orthodox bowler
 David Callaghan (born 1965), all-rounder
 Jimmy Cook (born 1953), right-handed batsman
 Hansie Cronje (1969–2002), Proteas captain, all-rounder
 Daryll Cullinan (born 1967), right-handed batsman
 Basil D'Oliveira (1931–2011), right-handed batsman
 Dominic Daniels (born 1992), right-handed batsman
 Alan Dawson (born 1969), right-arm fast medium bowler
 AB de Villiers (born 1984), Proteas captain, wicket-keeper and right-handed batsman
 Faf du Plessis (born 1984), Proteas captain and right-handed batsman
 Fanie de Villiers (born 1964), right-arm fast medium bowler
 Matthew Dennington (born 1982), cricketer
 Boeta Dippenaar (born 1977), right-handed batsman
 Allan Donald (born 1966), right-arm fast bowler
 Jean-Paul Duminy (born 1984), left-handed batsman
 Luc Durandt (born 1989), right-arm medium bowler
 Zac Elkin (born 1991), wicketkeeper
 Clive Eksteen (born 1966), left-arm spin bowler
 Steve Elworthy (born 1965), right-arm fast medium bowler
 Dennis Gamsy (born 1940), Test wicket-keeper
 Herschelle Gibbs (born 1974), right-handed batsman
 Norman Gordon (1911–2014), fast bowler
 Tony Greig (1946–2012), right-handed batsman and commentator
 Francois Haasbroek (born 1987), right-handed batsman
 Andrew Hall (born 1975), all-rounder
 Nantie Hayward (born 1977), right-arm fast bowler
 Benjamin Hector (born 1979), right-handed batsman
 Claude Henderson (born 1972), left-arm spin bowler
 Omar Henry (born 1952), left-arm spin bowler
 Israel Hlengani (born 1988), left-handed batsman
 Andrew Hudson (born 1952), right-handed opening batsman
 Martin van Jaarsveld (born 1974), right-handed batsman
 Steven Jack (born 1970), right-arm fast medium bowler
 Jacques Kallis (born 1975), all-rounder
 Chad Keegan (born 1979), cricketer
 Justin Kemp (born 1977), all-rounder
 Jon Kent (born 1979), cricketer
 Gary Kirsten (born 1967), left-handed opening batsman
 Peter Kirsten (born 1955), right-handed batsman
 Lance Klusener (born 1971), all-rounder
 Garnett Kruger (born 1977), right-arm fast medium bowler
 Adrian Kuiper (born 1959), all-rounder
 Charl Langeveldt (born 1974), right-arm fast medium bowler
 Gerhardus Liebenberg (born 1972), right-handed batsman and wicket-keeper
 Allan Lamb (born 1954), right-hand batsman
 Craig Matthews (born 1965), right-arm fast medium bowler
 Neil McKenzie (born 1975), right-handed batsman
 Brian McMillan (born 1963), all-rounder
 Albie Morkel (born 1981), right-handed batsman
 Morné Morkel (born 1984), cricketer
 Brad Moses (born 1983), cricketer
 Victor Mpitsang (born 1980), right-arm fast medium bowler
 André Nel (born 1977), fast bowler
 Christo Niewoudt, cricketer
 Makhaya Ntini (born 1977), fast bowler
 Jonathan October (born 1974), right-arm medium bowler
 Justin Ontong (born 1980), right-arm spin bowler
 Hugh Page (born 1961), right arm fast bowler
 Robin Peterson (born 1979), left-arm spin bowler
 Kevin Pietersen (born 1980), right-handed batsman
 Graeme Pollock (born 1944), left-handed batsman
 Shaun Pollock (born 1973), Proteas captain, fast-medium bowler
 Nic Pothas (born 1973), right-handed batsman and wicket-keeper
 Ashwell Prince (born 1977), left-handed batsman
 Meyrick Pringle (born 1966), right-arm fast medium swing bowler
 Andrew Puttick (born 1980), cricketer
 Jonty Rhodes (born 1969), right-handed batsman
 Clive Rice (1949–2015), all-rounder
 Dave Richardson (born 1959), right-handed batsman and wicketkeeper
 Jacques Rudolph (born 1981), left-handed batsman
 Mark Rushmere (born 1965), right-handed batsman
 Brett Schultz (born 1970), left-arm fast bowler
 Lawrence Seeff (born 1959), batsmen
 Graeme Smith (born 1981), Proteas captain, batsman
 Greg Smith (born 1971), cricketer
 Percy Sonn (1949–2007), sixth president of the International Cricket Council, first ICC president from Africa
 Errol Stewart (born 1969), right-handed batsman and wicket-keeper
 Dale Steyn (born 1983), right-arm fast bowler
 Rudi Steyn (born 1967), cricketer
 Pieter Strydom (born 1969), cricketer
 Fred Susskind (1891–1957), Test batsman
 Pat Symcox (born 1960), right-arm spin bowler
 Roger Telemachus (born 1973), right-arm fast medium bowler
 David Terbrugge (born 1977), right-arm fast medium bowler
 Leslie Wenzler (born 1962), first-class cricketer
 Kepler Wessels (born 1957), Proteas captain, left-handed batsman
 Henry Williams (born 1967), right-arm fast medium bowler
 Charl Willoughby (born 1974), cricketer
 James Wood (born 1985), wicket-keeper
 Mandy Yachad (born 1960), cricketer
 Monde Zondeki (born 1982), right-arm fast bowler

Cycling 

 John-Lee Augustyn (born 1986)
 Ryan Cox (1979–2007)
 David George (born 1976)
 Robbie Hunter (born 1977)
 Daryl Impey (born 1984)
 Laurens Meintjes (1868–1941)
 Burry Stander (1987–2013)
 Carla Swart (1987–2011)

Golf 

 Ernie Els (born 1969)
 Retief Goosen (born 1969)
 Trevor Immelman (born 1979)
 Gary Player (born 1936)
 Rory Sabbatini (born 1976)
 Charl Schwartzel (born 1984)
 Sewsunker "Papwa" Sewgolum (1930–1978)
 David Frost (born 1959)

Ice Hockey 

 Rudi Ball (1911–1975), German-South African Hall of Fame ice hockey player
 Olaf Kölzig, goaltender (born 1970)

Motorsports 
See also: South African racecar drivers and Formula One drivers

 Greg Albertyn, World and American Motocross Champion
 Rory Byrne, racing car designer for Ferrari and others
 Dave Charlton, Formula One driver
 Giniel de Villiers, rally raid driver, 2009 Dakara Rally winner
 Jan Hettema, five times SA Rally Drivers Champion and Springbok cyclist
 Grant Langston, World and American Motocross Champion
 Gordon Murray, Grand Prix car designer (born 1946)
 Tyla Rattray, World Motocross Champion
 Ian Scheckter, Formula One driver (brother of Jody Scheckter)
 Jody Scheckter, 1979 Formula One world champion (born 1950)
 Tomas Scheckter, South Africa, Indy Racing League driver
 Wayne Taylor, sports car driver and team owner, 1994 IMSA GT champion
 Sarel van der Merwe, rally and racing driver, multiple SA Rally Drivers Champion.

Netball 

 Irene van Dyk, played for South Africa and New Zealand, most capped international player of all time (born 1972)
 Leana De Bruin, played for South Africa and New Zealand (born 1977)

Rugby 

 Louis Babrow, national team
 Bakkies Botha, Springbok, lock (born 1979)
 Naas Botha, Springbok, flyhalf and TV presenter (born 1958)
 Schalk Burger, Springbok, flank (born 1983)
 Kitch Christie, Springbok coach (1940–1998)
 Danie Craven, Springbok, scrumhalf and administrator (1910–1994)
 Jean de Villiers, Springbok, centre and wing (born 1981)
 Peter de Villiers, Springbok coach (born 1957)
 Morne du Plessis, Springbok, eight man (born 1949)
 Frik du Preez, Springbok, lock/flank (born 1935)
 Os du Randt, Springbok, prop (born 1972)
 Okey Geffin, forward, national team (1921–2004)
 Danie Gerber, Springbok, centre (born 1958)
 Gerrie Germishuys, Springbok, wing (born 1949)
 Bryan Habana, Springbok, wing (born 1983)
 Siyamthanda Kolisi, currently Springbok captain, loose forward (born 1991)
 Butch James, Springbok, flyhalf (born 1979)
 Joe Kaminer, national team (1934–2021)
 Shawn Lipman, U.S. national team
 Victor Matfield, Springbok, lock (born 1977)
 Alan Menter, national team
 Percy Montgomery, Springbok, fullback (born 1974)
 Cecil Moss, national team
 Sydney Nomis, national team (1901–1962)
 Bennie Osler, Springbok, fly-half (1901–1962)
 Francois Pienaar, Springbok, flank (born 1967)
 Jeremy Reingold, swimmer and rugby player
 Myer Rosenblum, flanker, South Africa national team (1907–2002)
 John Smit, Springbok, hooker (born 1978)
 Fred Smollan, national team (1908–1998)
 François Steyn, Springbok, flyhalf/fullback (born 1987)
 Joel Stransky, Springbok, flyhalf, kicked winning points in 1995 Rugby World Cup, played by Scott Eastwood in Invictus (born 1967)
 Gary Teichmann, Springbok, number 8 (born 1967)
 Harry Vermaas (born 1984), hooker
 Frank Wagenstroom (born 1985), wing
 Joost van der Westhuizen, Springbok, scrum-half (1971–2017)
 Jake White, Springbok coach (born 1963)
 Chester Williams, Springbok, wing (1970–2019)
 Morris Zimerman (1911–1992)

Soccer 

 Jonathan Armogam (born 1981), midfielder and striker
 Gary Bailey (born 1958), goalkeeper for England and Manchester United
 Marawaan Bantam (born 1977), midfielder
 Shaun Bartlett (born 1972), striker
 Arthur Bunch (1909–1973), inside right forward
 Rodney Bush (born 1955), defender
 Nelson "Teenage" Dladla (born 1954), midfielder
 Kagisho Dikgacoi (born 1984), midfielder for Fulham and Crystal Palace
 Cliff Durandt (1940–2002), winger
 Mark Fish (born 1974), defender for Bolton Wanderers, Charlton Athletic and Jomo Cosmos
 Quinton Fortune (born 1977), midfielder and defender for Manchester United
 Bevan Fransch (born 1986), defender
 Dean Furman (born 1988), midfielder for Oldham Athletic
 Siboniso Gaxa (born 1984), defender for Lierse S.K.
 Gordon Gilbert (born 1982), central defender
 Ryan Hodgskin (born 1977), right back
 Junior Khanye (born 1985), winger
 Doctor Khumalo (born 1967), midfielder
 Cys Kurland (fl. 1947), player
 Bonginkosi Macala (born 1985), winger
 Collen Makgopela (born 1985), striker
 Lesley Manyathela (1981–2003), Bafana Bafana and Orlando Pirates striker
 Wayne Matle (born 1988), right-back
 Peter Matshitse (born 1971), defender
 Masonwabe Maseti (born 1987), midfielder
 Goodman Mazibuko (born 1975), midfielder
 Matome Mathiane (born 1988), Lamontville Golden Arrows captain, defender
 Benni McCarthy (born 1977), striker
 Jorry Merahe (born 1980), midfielder
 Senzo Meyiwa (1982–2014), Bafana Bafana and Orlando Pirates captain, goalkeeper
 Thandokuhle Mkhonza (born 1980), goalkeeper
 Aaron Mokoena (born 1980), defender, most capped player on the national team
 Tebogo Monyai (born 1979), defender
 Ditheko Mototo (born 1980), defender
 Sydney Nkalanga, footballer
 John Bheki Nkambule (born 1981), midfielder
 Siyabonga Nomvete (born 1977), striker
 Innocent Ntsume (born 1980), midfielder
 Steven Pienaar (born 1982), Everton F.C. midfielder
 Lucas Radebe (born 1969), Bafana Bafana captain, defender
 Siyabonga Sangweni (born 1981), South African football defender
 Itumeleng Sekwale (born 1983), footballer
 Clint Sipho Sephadi (born 1973), midfielder
 Ntokozo Sikhakhane (born 1983), midfielder
 Bamuza Sono (born 1980), midfielder
 Eric Bhamuza Sono (1937–1964), Orlando Pirates captain
 Jomo Sono (born 1955), midfielder and coach
 Jacob Tshisevhe (born 1969), defender

Surfing 

 John Whitmore, father of South African surfing (1929–2001)
 Shaun Tomson, former world champ (born 1955)
 Grant Baker, winner of the Mavericks Big Wave contest in California
 Martin Potter (surfer), 1989 world champ (born 1965)
 Jordy Smith, winner of the 2010 and 2011 ASP World Tour Billabong Pro Jeffreys Bay events (born 1988)

Swimming 

 Chad le Clos, Olympic gold medallist (born 1992)
 Natalie du Toit, disabled swimmer (born 1984)
 Lyndon Ferns, Olympic gold medallist (born 1983)
 Penny Heyns, breaststroke, Olympic gold medallist (born 1974)
 Karen Muir, backstroke, youngest world record holder in any sport in 1965 at 12 years old (1952–2013)
 Ryk Neethling, freestyle, Olympic gold medallist (born 1977)
 Sarah Poewe, Olympic bronze medallist (4x100 medley relay) (born 1983)
 Jeremy Reingold, swimmer and rugby player
 Roland Mark Schoeman, freestyle, Olympic gold medallist (born 1980)
 Darian Townsend, Olympic gold medallist (born 1984)
 Charlene Wittstock, backstroke swimmer (born 1978)

Tennis 

 Neil Broad, seven ATP tour doubles titles and Olympic doubles silver medallist (born 1966)
 Amanda Coetzer, 1998 Family Circle Cup (born 1971)
 Kevin Curren, four Grand Slam doubles titles (born 1958)
 Cliff Drysdale, player and television commentator (born 1941)
Esmé Emmanuel, tennis player (born 1947)
 Roger Federer, holds both Swiss and South African citizenship (born 1981)
 Wayne Ferreira, 1996 Canada Masters, 2000 Eurocard Open and Olympic doubles silver medallist (born 1971)
 Ian Froman, South African-born Israeli tennis player and patron
Marlene Gerson (born 1940), player
 Bob Hewitt, men's doubles champion: Wimbledon, French and US Open; convicted rapist (born 1940)
 Ilana Kloss, won 1976 US Open Women's Doubles (w/Linky Boshoff), highest world doubles ranking # 1 (born 1956)
 Johan Kriek, 1981 and '82 Australian Open champion (born 1958)
Julian Krinsky, American, former South African, tennis player
 Syd Levy, player; competed at Wimbledon, the French Championships, the U.S. Open, and Davis Cup, and won a silver medal at the Maccabiah Games (born 1922)
 Rod Mandelstam (born 1942), South African tennis player
 Frew McMillan (born 1942), men's doubles champion at Wimbledon, French and US Open
 Jack Saul, South African-Israeli tennis player
David Schneider (born 1955), South African-Israeli tennis player
 Abe Segal (1930–2016), tennis player, competed in all four Grand Slams and in Davis Cup

Triathlon 
 Conrad Stoltz (born 1973)
 Dan Hugo (born 1985)

Other sports 

 Gonda Betrix (born 1943), South Africa at the 1992 Summer Olympics in individual show jumping
William Ronald Eland (1923-2003), weightlifter

See also 
 Olympic gold medalists for South Africa
 Lists of sportspeople
 List of flag bearers for South Africa at the Olympics